What Price Glory? is a 1926 American silent comedy-drama war film produced and distributed by Fox Film Corporation and directed by Raoul Walsh. The film is based on the 1924 play What Price Glory by Maxwell Anderson and Laurence Stallings and was remade in 1952 as What Price Glory starring James Cagney. Malcolm Stuart Boylan, founder of the U.S. Coast Guard Auxiliary, was title writer on the silent Fox attraction.

Plot 
Flagg and Quirt are veteran United States Marines whose rivalry dates back a number of years. Flagg is commissioned a captain, he is in command of a company on the front lines of France during World War I. Sergeant Quirt is assigned to Flagg's unit as the senior non-commissioned officer. Flagg and Quirt quickly resume their rivalry, which this time takes its form over the affections of Charmaine, the daughter of the local innkeeper. However, Charmaine's desire for a husband and the reality of war give the two men a common cause.

Cast 
 Edmund Lowe as 1st Sergeant Quirt
 Victor McLaglen as Captain Flagg
 Dolores del Río as Charmaine de la Cognac
 William V. Mong as Cognac Pete
 Phyllis Haver as Shanghai Mabel
 Elena Jurado as Carmen, Philippine girl
 Leslie Fenton as Lieutenant Moore
 Barry Norton as Private 'Mother's Boy' Lewisohn
 Sammy Cohen as Private Lipinsky
 Ted McNamara as Private Kiper
 August Tollaire as French Mayor
 Mathilde Comont as Camille, fat lady
 Patrick Rooney as Mulcahy (billed as Pat Rooney)
 J. Carrol Naish bit part

Production

Fox acquired the rights to What Price Glory? for $100,000.

The film was directed by Raoul Walsh and released as a silent film by Fox Film Corporation on November 23, 1926 in the US, and had a 116-minute running time. On January 21, 1927, a short film of singer Raquel Meller was shown before this feature at the Sam H. Harris Theater in New York City. The short film, not quite synchronized, was the first public presentation of a film in the Fox Movietone sound-on-film system. In January 1927, Fox re-released What Price Glory? with synchronized sound effects and music in the Movietone system.

Part of its fame revolves around the fact that the characters can be seen speaking profanities which are not reflected in the intertitles, but which can be deciphered by lipreaders. The studio was reportedly inundated by calls and letters from enraged Americans, including deaf and hearing impaired people, to whom the vivid profanity between Sergeant Quirt and Captain Flagg was extremely offensive.

In the 1924 Broadway play the roles of Captain Flagg and Sgt. Quirt were played by Louis Wolheim, fresh from his triumph in Eugene O'Neill's The Hairy Ape and William "Stage" Boyd. Curiously Wolheim and the younger William Boyd would play characters similar to Quirt and Flagg in the 1928 film Two Arabian Knights.

Although the title is sometimes listed as having a question mark, the Movietone version has simply 'WHAT PRICE GLORY', as does at least one silent trailer as well as some of the posters.

In his autobiography, Peter Cushing claimed his wife, Violet Hélène Beck Cushing was part of the cast prior to their marriage.

Further reading

Adaptation
McLaglen and Lowe reprised their roles from the movie in the radio program Captain Flagg and Sergeant Quirt, broadcast on the Blue Network September 28, 1941 – January 25, 1942, and on NBC February 13, 1942 – April 3, 1942.

Sequels
The Cock-Eyed World (1929) (directed by Raoul Walsh)
Women of All Nations (1931) (directed by Raoul Walsh)
The Stolen Jools (1931) (cameo)
Hot Pepper (1933)

Lowe and McLaglen played two similar Marines in the RKO Radio Pictures film Call Out the Marines (1942).

References

External links 
 
 What Price Glory? at SilentEra
 

1926 films
1920s war comedy-drama films
American war comedy-drama films
American silent feature films
Fox Film films
American black-and-white films
American films based on plays
Films directed by Raoul Walsh
Military humor in film
Films about the United States Marine Corps
Western Front (World War I) films
Films set in the Philippines
1920s English-language films
1920s American films
Silent war films
Silent American comedy-drama films